Bintang Timur Futsal Club Surabaya is an Indonesian professional futsal club based in Surabaya, East Java. The club plays in the Indonesia Pro Futsal League.

Sponsor

Players

Current squad

Honours

National competitions
Indonesia Pro Futsal League: 1
2021

Subregional competitions
AFF Futsal Cup: 1
2022

References

External links 
 Official website

Futsal clubs in Indonesia
Sport in East Java
Futsal clubs established in 2015
2015 establishments in Indonesia